László (Ladislaus) Szollás (13 November 1907 – 4 October 1980) was a Hungarian world champion and Olympic medalist pair skater.

Early life
Szollas was Jewish. He attended the Ludovika Military Academy in the Horthy era..

Figure skating career
With partner Emília Rotter he won the World Figure Skating Championship four times in five years (1931, 1933, 1934, and 1935), and they were the 1932 World silver medalists.  They were also the 1934 European Champions, and 1930 and 1931 silver medalists.

They represented Hungary at the 1932 Winter Olympics and at the 1936 Winter Olympics, winning two bronze medals.

Later life

Subsequently, he fought against the Soviet Union on the eastern front in WW2. He became a prisoner of war and was imprisoned in a POW camp for 4 years in Siberia. Upon returning to Hungary the Hungarian Stalinist government nationalized nearly all of his assets, including a large rental apartment building in Budapest's 7th district..

After retirement, he attended Semmelweis Medical School in Budapest and earned a medical degree at the Péter Pázmány University and became a sports medicine doctor at the Sport Korhaz (Hospital for Professional Sports) in Budapest and a surgeon at the Országos Sportegészségügyi Intézet in Budapest. After the war he returned to Hungary and worked as a physician in the National Institute of Physical Education and Sports Hygiene in Budapest and served as President of the Hungarian Skating Association.

Hall of Fame
He and his partner, Emília Rotter, were elected to the International Jewish Sports Hall of Fame in 1995.

Competitive highlights
(with Rotter)

See also
List of select Jewish figure skaters
List of flag bearers for Hungary at the Olympics

References

External links
 Pairs on Ice profile
 Jews in Sports bio
 
 
 

1907 births
1980 deaths
Hungarian male pair skaters
Figure skaters at the 1932 Winter Olympics
Figure skaters at the 1936 Winter Olympics
Olympic figure skaters of Hungary
Olympic bronze medalists for Hungary
Figure skaters from Budapest
Olympic medalists in figure skating
World Figure Skating Championships medalists
European Figure Skating Championships medalists
Medalists at the 1932 Winter Olympics
Medalists at the 1936 Winter Olympics
Jewish Hungarian sportspeople
Jewish sportspeople
Semmelweis University alumni
Hungarian military personnel of World War II
Hungarian prisoners of war
World War II prisoners of war held by the Soviet Union